Castle of Blood is a 1964 horror film directed by  Antonio Margheriti and Sergio Corbucci. The film stars Barbara Steele, Arturo Dominici and Georges Rivière. The film was initially commissioned to director Sergio Corbucci, who had Gianni Grimaldi and Bruno Corbucci set to write the film. A scheduling conflict led to Corbucci's friend Margheriti being hired to complete the film. To avoid going over time, Corbucci was brought in to film one scene.

The film was released in Italy in 1964 and received low box office numbers which led to Margheriti remaking the film in colour as Web of the Spider (1971).

Plot 

A journalist challenges the authenticity of Edgar Allan Poe's stories (which are presented in the context of the film as Poe's eyewitness accounts of the supernatural, not as literary fiction). To prove himself, the journalist accepts a bet from Lord Blackwood to spend the night in a haunted castle on All Soul's Eve. Ghosts of the murdered inhabitants appear to him throughout the night, re-enacting the events that led to their deaths. One of the ghosts reveals that they all need his blood in order to maintain their existence. Barbara Steele plays a ghost who attempts to help the journalist escape.

Cast 
Barbara Steele as Elisabeth Blackwood
Georges Rivière as Alan Foster
Margarete Robsahm as Julia
Arturo Dominici as Dr. Carmus
Silvano Tranquilli as Edgar Allan Poe
Sylvia Sorrente as Elsi
Giovanni Cianfriglia as  Herbert
Umberto Raho as  Lord Thomas Blackwood
Salvo Randone as  Lester 
Benito Stefanelli as  William

Production
The idea for Castle of Blood came to Sergio Corbucci when producer Giovanni Addessi commissioned him to create a film that would reuse the Medieval sets from Corbucci's comedy film The Monk of Monza. Corbucci had his brother Bruno Corbucci and screenwriter Gianni Grimaldi write the script. The script is credited to a short story by Edgar Allan Poe, but the film is not based on any specific Poe work. According to Ruggero Deodato, who was the assistant director on set, he persuaded actress Barbara Steele to star in the film, although Steele had just done 8½ for director Federico Fellini, and wanted to distance herself from horror films. When filming was about to begin, Sergio Corbucci found that his schedule conflicted with the shoot and called upon his friend Antonio Margheriti to direct the film.

Margheriti had a tight schedule for filming, and shot the film using the same method as a television production by setting up four cameras at once. To finish the film on time, Margheriti brought in Sergio Corbucci to direct the scene where Giovanni Cingriglia's characters murder Steele's character. The film was eventually shot in 15 days.

Release
Castle of Blood was distributed in Italy by Globe International Film and released on 27 February 1964. The film grossed a total of 100.68 million Italian lire in Italy. It was released in France on 14 April 1965 under the title "Danse Macabre" (Dance of Death). The French cut of the film features actress Sylvia Sorrente in a nude scene.

The film's disappointing box office was one of the reasons that Margheriti remade the film as Web of the Spider in colour in 1970. Margheriti would later comment that it was "stupid to remake it" and that "the color cinematography destroyed everything: the atmosphere, the tension."

Critical reception 
From contemporary reviews, The Globe and Mail praised the film, noting an "ingenious script" and the acting by Georges Rivière, stating that the film was an "example of how an imaginative director can use camera, music, and a deliberately slow pace to fray the nerve ends." The review critiqued the ghost special effects as "unconvincing", and found Barbara Steele's performance to be melodramatic. The Monthly Film Bulletin praised the cinematography of the film but referred to Ortolani's score as "cliche-ridden", and wrote negatively about Steele's acting and the dubbed dialogue.

Margheriti would later call the film "even more boring" many years after its initial release. AllMovie's review of the film was favorable, calling it an "eerie and effective early horror film."

See also
List of French films of 1964
List of horror films of 1964
List of Italian films of 1964

References

Footnotes

Sources

External links 
 
 

Italian haunted house films
Gothic horror films
Italian horror films
1960s Italian-language films
1964 horror films
Films directed by Antonio Margheriti
Films directed by Sergio Corbucci
1964 films
French horror films
Films scored by Riz Ortolani
Films set in castles
Cultural depictions of Edgar Allan Poe
Works about Edgar Allan Poe
French haunted house films
1960s Italian films
1960s French films